Malcolm Donaldson FRCS FRCOG (27 April 1884 - 16 March 1973) was physician-accoucheur at St Bartholomew's Hospital, London, and director of the cancer department there. 

He studied medicine at the University of Cambridge, qualifying (MB BCh) in 1912. During the World War i he served as an officer with the Royal Army Medical Corps.  After the war, he led efforts to promote national cancer education for the public, but his efforts met with resistance.   

Donaldson was  Vice-Chairman of the National Radium Commission, a member of the Radiology Committee of the Medical Research Council, and a founding fellow of the Royal College of Obstetricians and Gynaecologists.

References 

1884 births
1973 deaths
Fellows of the Royal College of Surgeons
Fellows of the Royal College of Obstetricians and Gynaecologists
Physician-accoucheurs
British oncologists
British Army personnel of World War I
Royal Army Medical Corps officers

20th-century British medical doctors
British gynaecologists